Worsley Mesnes is a suburb of Wigan in the Metropolitan Borough of Wigan in Greater Manchester, England. The ward population at the 2011 census was 11,974.

Transport
Worsley Mesnes Drive is the main road through the housing estate. In 2015, it was fitted with WRTL Luma LED streetlights to replace the Philips Iridiums fitted in 2006.

Etymology
Mesnes is from French demesnes, of the manor.

References

Historically, it forms part of Lancashire.

Areas of Wigan